Abisara sobrina is a butterfly in the family Riodinidae. It is located in southern China, primarily western Yunnan.

References

Butterflies described in 1923
Abisara